Lucia Romanov-Stark (née Romanov; born 28 April 1959) is a former professional tennis player from Romania and former member of the Romania Fed Cup team. In 1983, she reached her highest WTA singles ranking of world number 30.

Junior Grand Slam finals

Singles: 1 final (1 runner-up)

Personal life
Lucia has a twin sister, Maria, with whom she played team doubles for the Romania Fed Cup team. In 1984 she married American Jim Stark and moved to the United States. The couple have a son, Talon Stark, who is an American mathematician.

References

External links
 
 
 

1959 births
Living people
Tennis players from Bucharest
Romanian female tennis players
Universiade medalists in tennis
Romanian twins
Twin sportspeople
Universiade silver medalists for Romania
Universiade bronze medalists for Romania